Live at the Roundhouse may refer to:

 Live at the Roundhouse 1975, an album by Pink Fairies, 1982
 Live at the Roundhouse (Dresden Dolls album), 2007
 Live at the Roundhouse, an album by Nick Mason's Saucerful of Secrets, 2020

See also
 Roundhouse (venue) § Discography